Most power plants in West Bengal are coal-based thermal power plants. In addition, there are some hydropower and gas power plants.

Conventional

Thermal power plant

Coal

Gas-based

Renewable

Hydroelectric

Solar

References

Coal-fired power stations in West Bengal